Circleville is a hamlet  in the Town of Wallkill, part of Orange County, New York, United States. It is located on NY 302, around the junction with the old Goshen Turnpike (Orange County 101), a short distance north of NY 17 and two miles (3 km) south of Bullville.

It has its own post office, with the ZIP Code 10919, and lends its name to a nearby middle and elementary school of the Pine Bush Central School District, as well as the local fire district.

References

External links
Circleville, NY community site

Hamlets in New York (state)
Hamlets in Orange County, New York
Poughkeepsie–Newburgh–Middletown metropolitan area